Protein arginine N-methyltransferase 5 is an enzyme that in humans is encoded by the PRMT5 gene.  PRMT5 symmetrically dimethylates H2AR3, H4R3, H3R2, and H3R8 in vivo, all of which are linked to a range of transcriptional regulatory events.

PRMT5 is a highly conserved arginine methyltransferase that translocated from the cytoplasm to the nucleus at embryonic day ~E8.5, and during preimplantation development at the ~4-cell stage.

Model organisms

Model organisms have been used in the study of PRMT5 function. A conditional knockout mouse line, called Prmt5tm2a(EUCOMM)Wtsi was generated as part of the International Knockout Mouse Consortium program — a high-throughput mutagenesis project to generate and distribute animal models of disease to interested scientists.

Male and female animals underwent a standardized phenotypic screen to determine the effects of deletion. Twenty five tests were carried out on mutant mice and two significant abnormalities were observed. No homozygous mutant embryos were identified during gestation, and therefore none survived until weaning. The remaining tests were carried out on heterozygous mutant adult mice but no further abnormalities were observed.

A conditional allele of Prmt5 in the mouse limb shows that it is essential for maintaining a progenitor population, as conditional mutants have limb defects

Interactions 

Protein arginine methyltransferase 5 has been shown to interact with:
 CLNS1A,
 Janus kinase 2, 
 SNRPD3, 
 SUPT5H,
 MEP50,
 RIOK1, 
 COPR5.

PRMT5 has been shown to interact with CLNS1A, RIOK1 and COPR5 through an interface created by a shallow groove located on the TIM barrel domain of PRMT5 and the consensus sequence GQF[D/E]DA[E/D] located in the terminal regions of the adaptor proteins. The characterisation of the interactions occurring in the binding groove between PRMT5 and peptides derived from the adaptor proteins lead to development of protein-protein interaction (PPI) inhibitors, modulating binding between PRMT5 and the adaptor proteins. Furthermore, Asberry and co-workers synthesised the first-in-class small molecule inhibitor of the PPI between PRMT5 and MEP50. The PPI inhibitors complement a plethora of compounds directly suppressing the enzymatic activity of PRMT5.

References

Further reading 

 
 
 
 
 
 
 
 
 
 
 
 

Genes mutated in mice